Automoto was a French professional cycling team that existed from 1910 to 1952. Its main sponsor was French bicycle and motorcycle manufacturer Automoto. The Automoto cycling team rose to its fullest prominence in the peloton after World War One. Its riders dominated professional cycling's premier event, the Tour de France, from 1923-1926 with a series of convincing victories captained by riders with international appeal like Henri Pellisier (France), Ottavio Bottecchia (Italy) and Lucien Buysse (Belgium).

References

External links

Cycling teams based in France
Defunct cycling teams based in France
1910 establishments in France
1952 disestablishments in France
Cycling teams established in 1910
Cycling teams disestablished in 1952